The Annolied ("Song of Anno") is an Early Middle High German poem in praise of Archbishop Anno II of Cologne. Anno died in 1075 and the poem, probably written in the years immediately after his death, can be seen as part of a campaign for his canonisation, which was finally achieved in 1183.

Sources
There is no surviving manuscript of the Annolied. Our knowledge of the poem comes mainly from the printed version published by Martin Opitz in 1639. Part of the poem had been published previously by Bonaventura Vulcanius in 1597, but this was only a short extract from the start of the work (strophes 2,1–5,4)). There are significant differences between the two printed versions: Vulcanius's is missing the prologue, has some additional lines, and differing strophe divisions. The two editors, therefore, must have drawn on different manuscripts, conventionally called *V and *O after their later editors.

However, the two manuscripts seem to be closely related and the codex probably combined the Annolied with Williram of Ebersberg's 'Expositio in Cantica Canticorum ("Commentary on the Song of Songs"): Opitz borrowed a Williram manuscript from his friend Michael Flandrin in Breslau, which may be the one held in the Breslau town library as R 347. The connection between the Annolied and a Williram manuscript in Breslau comes from a 15th century record which notes the presence in the Rhediger collection in the Breslau town library of a codex containing both the Annolied and Williram's text.

A manuscript transcription by Junius now in the Bodleian Library seems to be a copy of Opitz's edition rather than an independent source.

Dating
The principal point of reference for the dating is the mention of Mainz as the new place of coronation. This may refer to one of two coronations: 
Rudolf of Rheinfelden was crowned anti-king in opposition to Henry IV (who had been crowned in Aachen) in Mainz on 15 March 1077. Rudolf was succeeded by Hermann of Salm, who was crowned in Goslar in December 1081.
 Henry V was crowned in Mainz in January 1106.
Support for the earlier period 1077–81 comes from evidence that the Gesta Treverorum, which ends in 1106, drew on the Annolied. The Vita Annonis, a Latin life of Anno written in 1105, concentrates more on Anno's miracles, which suggests a later reworking of the story and an earlier date for the Annolied.

Content

The poem consists of three parts: the religious or spiritual history of the world and its salvation, from the creation to the time of Anno II; the secular history of the world up to the foundation of the German cities (including the theory of the world empires derived from the vision of the Book of Daniel); and finally the "Vita Annonis", or the biography of Archbishop Anno II.

A recent interpretation sees this threefold structure in the context of the poet's remark in the prologue that in the beginning God created two worlds, one spiritual and one earthly, and then he mixed these to create the first human, who, being both, was a "third world". The poem then charts spiritual and secular history and finally shows the two culminating in the biography of the man who stands at the centrepoint of history.  This is a remarkable and highly original historiographical approach.

Parts of the Annolied were incorporated into the later Middle High German Kaiserchronik and the two works are often considered together.

German origin story
The poem includes sections on four German peoples, the Swabians, Bavarians, Saxons and Franks, a typical medieval  story, telling in each case of their origins in the classical near east. The Annolied is the first text to give what later became quite a popular motif whereby the ancestors of the Bavarians migrated from Armenia.

Excerpt

See also
Middle High German literature
Vita Annonis Minor

Notes

Editions
 
 
 
  [Critical edition].

  [Diplomatic edition with English translation].

Literature

External links
Digital images of Opitz's edition
Text with English translation
Das Annolied (Bibliotheca Augustana)
Mittelhochdeutsches Textarchiv (mhgta): full text online

Middle High German literature
Medieval German poems
11th-century poems
11th-century German poets
Christian hagiography
Henry V, Holy Roman Emperor